Garbagnate Monastero is a comune (municipality) in the Province of Lecco in the Italian region Lombardy, located about  northeast of Milan and about  southwest of Lecco. Garbagnate Monastero borders the following municipalities: Barzago, Bulciago, Costa Masnaga, Molteno, Sirone.

In 1992 the municipality of Garbagnate Monastero  passed from the province of Como in the province of Lecco. The ISTAT code of the town before the change was 013104. Since 1997, the new CAP of the town is 23846. The old zip code was 22040. Economic activities include  packaging, machinery and engineering.

References

Cities and towns in Lombardy